A RESTful programming architecture that allows some services to be run on the client and some on the server.  For example, a product can first be released as a browser application and then functionality moved module by module to the client application.

See also
 Service-oriented architecture implementation framework
 Service-oriented modeling

External links 
Novell excerpt on Web Services Frameworks

Software architecture
Web services
Distributed computing architecture